Livadiya is an urban-type settlement in Crimea; a region recognized by nearly every member of the international community as part of Ukraine but forcibly incorporated by Russia as the Republic of Crimea after invading Ukraine in 2014. Population:

History
A minor Crimean Tatar settlement in the Middle Ages, Livadiya was named thus by Lambros Katsonis, a Greek revolutionary and Imperial Russian Army officer, after Livadeia, Greece, the town he was born in, then part of the Ottoman Empire. Katsonis had been granted an estate there by Empress Catherine II, which he named thus.

The estate later passed to the possession of the Potocki family and then, in 1861, it became a summer residence of the Russian tsars. Emperor Alexander III of Russia died there in 1894.

The Livadia Palace, built in 1910–11, architect Nikolai Krasnov, is now a museum. It was formerly a summer palace of the last Russian Imperial family. In 1945, it served as the meeting place of the Yalta Conference and residence of Franklin Delano Roosevelt during the Conference. Nowadays, Livadiia is known primarily for producing wine and is also a noted health resort.

Namesakes
A minor planet 3006 Livadia discovered by Soviet astronomer Nikolai Stepanovich Chernykh in 1979 is named after the suburb.

References

External links
 

Urban-type settlements in Crimea
Seaside resorts in Russia
Seaside resorts in Ukraine
Yalta Municipality